Lecithocera anglijuxta is a moth in the family Lecithoceridae. It was described by C. Wu in 1997. It is found in Thailand and China (Yunnan).

The wingspan is 17–17.5 mm. The forewings are yellowish-brown.

References

Moths described in 1997
anglijuxta